Lappi is a cheese made from partially skimmed cow's milk, very similar to Emmental except that it is pasteurized, and so is a little less flavorful, with smaller holes and a slightly firmer texture. It is so named because its recipe was developed in the Lapland region of Finland.

See also
 List of cheeses

External links
Cook's Thesaurus: Semi-Soft Cheeses

Finnish cheeses
Cow's-milk cheeses